Phalana Abbayi Phalana Ammayi is a 2023 Indian Telugu-language romantic comedy film written and directed by Srinivas Avasarala and starring Naga Shaurya and Malvika Nair in the lead roles. The film was released on 17 March 2023.

Plot

Cast 

 Naga Shaurya as Sanjay Pisapati
 Malvika Nair as Anupama Kasturi
 Srinivas Avasarala
 Megha Chowdhury
 Ashok Kumar
 Abhishek Maharshi
 Srividhya
 Varanasi Soumya Chalamcharla
 Harini Rao
 Arjun Prasad

Release  
The film was released on 17 March 2023.

Music

Reception 
The film received mixed to positive reviews.

References

External links